The Mirka class was the NATO reporting name for a class of light frigates built for the Soviet Navy in the mid to late 1960s. The Soviet designation was Storozhevoi Korabl (escort ship) Project 35 (Mirka I) and Project 35-M (Mirka II).

Design
The role of these ships was anti-submarine warfare in shallow waters and they were similar to the s but had a modified machinery suite. The machinery consisted of two shafts with diesels and gas turbines (CODAG). The propellers were in tunnels (similar to water jets). The machinery proved noisy and not very reliable.

Ships
A total of 18 ships were built by Yantar shipyard, Kaliningrad, for the Soviet Navy. All ships were decommissioned between 1989 and 1992.

Gallery

See also
 List of ships of the Soviet Navy
 List of ships of Russia by project number

References

 Conway's All the World's Fighting Ships 1947-1995

External links

 Page from FAS 
 Page in Russian
  Russian Mirka Class - Complete Ship List

Frigate classes
Frigates of the Soviet Navy